Crossroad is a 2017 Indian Malayalam-language anthology film comprising 10 stories. It is a portmanteau movie celebrating womanhood and tells the story of ten women. The movie encompasses ten featurette films of fifteen minutes each. The movie showcases each vibrant and variant facet of a Woman and tells the story from her perspective.

Plot

Pakshikalude Manam: Mythili portrays a bird photographer whose life motto is to see (and seemingly photograph) a rare bird called Aphrodite. The bird has feathers colored like a rainbow and the photographer goes to the forest to see it, against her husband's wish. Will she be able to see the bird forms the crux of the story.

Cast

Oru Raathriyude Kooli
Padmapriya Janakiraman as Seema
 V. K. Baiju
 Suryakanth

Kaaval
Priyanka Nair as Devi
Shibu Laban
Roslin
Pranav Nair as Devi's child

Pakshikalude Maanam 
Mythili as Photographer
Vijay Babu as Husband, Joe
Sidhartha Siva as Resort Owner
Chethan Jayalal as informer

Mounam
Manasa Radhakrishnan as Sally 
Seema G. Nair as Mariyamma, Sally's Mother
Anu Mohan as Jomon

Badar
Mamta Mohandas as Badarunneesa
Babu Annur as Madhavan Nair
Kailash as Unni

Mudra
Isha Talwar as Gaya Parameshwaran
Anjali Aneesh as Padmavathi
Poojappura Radhakrishnan

Lake House
Richa Panai as Aimy
Rahul Madhav as husband
Shobha Mohan

Kodeshyan
Punnasserry Kanchana as Grandma

Chrerivu
Al Sabith F as small son
Srinda Arhaan 
Manoj K. Jayan as Driver

Pinpe Nadappaval
Anjana Chandran
Joy Mathew
Sagar

Soundtrack
The film features original songs composed by Amrutha Suresh and Abhirami Suresh, Anitha Shaiq and M. Jayachandran.

Release

Critical reception
The Times of India rated 3 out of 5 stars. Sify rated 3.5 out of 5 stars.

References

External links
 

Indian anthology films
2010s Malayalam-language films
Indian drama films
Films directed by Lenin Rajendran
2017 drama films
Films scored by Sooraj S. Kurup